Delegation is the assignment of any responsibility or authority to another person.

Delegation may also refer to:

 Delegation (band), a British soul musical group 1975–1999
 Delegation (computing), passing of something from one entity to another
 Delegation (computer security), handing a user's authentication credentials to another user
 Delegation (law), in contract law, the act of giving another person the responsibility of carrying out agreed performance
 Delegation (object-oriented programming), evaluating a member of one object in the context of another
 Delegations of Tunisia, second-level administrative subdivisions
 The Delegation, a 2018 Albanian film

See also

 Delegate (disambiguation)
 Delegation theory
 Subsidiarity
 Subsidiarity (European Union)
 Subsidiarity (Catholicism)
 Devolution
 Municipalities of Mexico City, or delegaciones